Germany men's national Pitch and Putt team represents Germany in Pitch and putt international competitions.

It is managed by the DPPV – DEUTSCHER PITCH & PUTT VERBAND e.V. and the GPPGA – German Pitch & Putt Golf Agency.

It is an associated member of the European Pitch and Putt Association since 2008. Germany reached the 13th place in the 2008 Pitch and putt World Cup and the 8th plance in the 6th European Championship in 2010.

National team

Players
National team in the European Championship 2010
Manfred Kolvenbach
Harald Brinkmeyer
Philipp von Witzendorff
Sven Göth
Max Hergt

National team in the World Cup 2008
 Heiko Tigges
 Ralf Kerkeling
 Silvio Dietz

See also
World Cup Team Championship
European Team Championship

External links
DPPV DEUTSCHER PITCH & PUTT VERBAND e.V.
GPPGA German Pitch & Putt Golf Agency
EPPA European Pitch and Putt Association website
FIPPA Federation of International Pitch and Putt Associations website

National pitch and putt teams
Pitch and putt